Dmitry Zaurovich Akhba (born 6 September 1985) is a former Russian professional association football player. He has also appeared for the Abkhazia national football team, recently competing in the 2014 ConIFA World Football Cup.

Club career
He played 3 seasons in the Russian Football National League for FC Volgar Astrakhan, FC Baikal Irkutsk and FC Khimki.

External links
 
 

1985 births
People from Maykop
Living people
Russian footballers
Footballers from Abkhazia
Russian people of Abkhazian descent
Association football forwards
FC Volgar Astrakhan players
FC Khimki players
FC Avangard Kursk players
FC Baikal Irkutsk players
Sportspeople from Adygea